Behind the iliac fossa is a rough surface, divided into two portions, an anterior and a posterior. The posterior portion, known as the iliac tuberosity, is elevated and rough, for the attachment of the posterior sacroiliac ligaments and for the origins of the sacrospinalis and multifidus.

References

External links
 

Bones of the pelvis
Ilium (bone)